Across the Line is a 2000 American Neo-Western film directed by Martin Spottl and starring Brad Johnson and Sigal Erez. Johnson plays a small-town Texas sheriff who falls for an illegal immigrant (Erez) who witnessed a murder on the Mexican border. While not an overtly political film, Across the Line portrays illegal immigrants in a generally positive light and dramatizes their motivations and problems from a sympathetic point of view. In La Opinion Jean Rodriguez Flores wrote, "The film Across the Line isn't just about the difficulties of crossing illegally into the United States, but it also reflects the tragedy of hundreds of people who are forced to leave their families for the "promised land." Some critics praised the film for its emotional intensity, authenticity, and integrity, but others questioned it for turning the plight of illegal immigrants into mainstream entertainment. Independently financed and produced, Across the Line was distributed by Lionsgate Entertainment.

Plot

Cast
 Brad Johnson as Sheriff Grant Johnson
 Sigal Erez as Miranda
 Brian Bloom as Walt
 Adrienne Barbeau as Mrs. Randall
 J. C. Quinn as Harmon
 Marshall Teague as Ty Parker Johnson
 Justin Urich as Billy
 Julio Dolce Vita as Jesus

Soundtrack
Charlie Daniels composed and performed the score, including the title track, Across the Line, which he released on his 2000 album Road Dogs.

Development
Martin Sheen was originally cast to play the role of Harmon, the compassionate diner owner.

References

External links
 
 
 

2000 films
2000 independent films
2000 thriller drama films
2000 Western (genre) films
American independent films
American political drama films
American political thriller films
American Western (genre) films
Films directed by Martin Spottl
Films set in Texas
Films set in Mexico
Films set in Guatemala
2000s English-language films
2000s Spanish-language films
2000 drama films
Neo-Western films
2000s American films